Kristi S. Anseth is the Tisone Distinguished Professor of Chemical and Biological Engineering, an Associate Professor of Surgery, and a Howard Hughes Medical Investigator at the University of Colorado at Boulder.  Her main research interests are the design of synthetic biomaterials using hydrogels, tissue engineering, and regenerative medicine.

Anseth was elected as a member into the National Academy of Engineering in 2009 for pioneering the rational design of biomaterials for tissue engineering, drug delivery, and biosensing applications.

Early life and education
Kristi Anseth grew up in Williston, North Dakota. She played on both the volleyball and basketball teams at the University of North Dakota-Williston, earning the honor of Academic All-American in her second year.

Kristi Anseth transferred to Purdue University where she began her research career as an undergraduate student in the lab of Nicholas A. Peppas, receiving her Bachelor of Science in Chemical Engineering in 1992.  She obtained her PhD in 1994, working under Christopher N. Bowman, himself a former graduate student of Nicholas Peppas, at the University of Colorado.

Career
After post-doctoral work with Robert Langer at Massachusetts Institute of Technology  and Thomas Cech, Anseth became an assistant professor at the Department of Chemical and Biological Engineering at the University of Colorado Boulder in 1996. She currently leads the Anseth Research Group as the Tisone Distinguished Professor of Chemical and Biological Engineering. She serves on Purdue's College of Engineering Advisory Council.

Anseth is working at the intersection of materials science, chemistry and biology, studying natural and synthetic hydrogels and using biomaterials to create an extracellular matrix to support three-dimensional cell enculturation.

Anseth is developing photopolymers that will change from soft to hard in response to cues such as ultraviolet light, and then degrade predictably over time. Such materials could be used to for orthopedic repairs, functioning as a replacement for damaged areas of bone and then slowly being replaced by regrowth of natural material as the body heals. Her pioneering approach applies photopolymerization and photodegradation to enable precise control in space and time of hydrogels' structure and composition. This research involves fundamental investigations into the molecular dynamics of processes at the cell-biomaterial interface.

Anseth is also working on the tissue engineering of biomaterials for the replacement of cartilage and heart valves. By combining photopolymers and lab-grown cartilage her lab is creating living replacements for worn-out joints. The problem is more difficult than replacing bone because the cartilage in joints, unlike bone, does not have the ability to regrow.

She has published more than 250 papers and filed for at least 18 patents.  She has been involved in editorial activities of journals including Biomacromolecules, Journal of Biomedical Materials Research — Part A, Acta Biomaterialia, Progress in Materials Science, Biotechnology and Bioengineering and Proceedings of the National Academy of Sciences of the United States of America.  In September 2014, she was elected the Vice President/President-Elect of the Materials Research Society (MRS), serving as Vice President in 2015 and President in 2016.

Awards and honors

In 1999, Anseth was named to the MIT Technology Review TR100 as one of the top 100 innovators in the world under the age of 35.

Kristi Anseth was the first engineer, male or female, to be selected as a Howard Hughes Medical Investigator. At age 40, she was the youngest member ever to be elected to both the National Academy of Engineering (2009) and the Institute of Medicine (2009). In 2013, she was also elected to the National Academy of Sciences.  She shares the distinction of being a member of all three with chemical engineers Cato Laurencin, Robert S. Langer, Nicholas A. Peppas, Frances Arnold, and Rakesh K. Jain.  As of 2015, she was also named to the National Academy of Inventors.
She was elected to the American Academy of Arts and Sciences in 2019.

Other awards and honors include: 
 2016, Honorary Doctorate, Purdue University, College of Engineering 
 2015, Bayer Distinguished Lectureship, University of Pittsburgh
 2015, Bonfils-Stanton Awards, Science and Medicine honoree
 2013, James E. Bailey Award, Society for Biological Engineering
 2012, Colorado Women's Hall of Fame
 2012, Distinguished Engineering Alumni award, Purdue University
 2009, Fellow of the Materials Research Society
 2008, Clemson Award for Basic Research from the Society for Biomaterials
 2005, Elizabeth Gee Award, University of Colorado
 2004, Alan T. Waterman Award, National Science Foundation
 2001, Outstanding Young Investigator Award, Materials Research Society.

References

External links
 Anseth Research Group, University of Colorado Boulder
 Colorado Women's Hall of Fame

Living people
21st-century American chemists
Howard Hughes Medical Investigators
1969 births
Fellows of the American Academy of Arts and Sciences
Members of the United States National Academy of Engineering
Members of the National Academy of Medicine
Place of birth missing (living people)
People from Williston, North Dakota
Purdue University College of Engineering alumni
University of Colorado Boulder alumni
Scientists from North Dakota